Laguda (dla-gu-da, rarely dla-gù-dé) was a Mesopotamian god most likely associated with the Persian Gulf.

Character
It is assumed that Laguda was a god of the sea, specifically the Persian Gulf. According to Wilfred G. Lambert, the possibility that Laguda was a god of the sea is supported by his frequent association with other deities of such character. Sirsir, a god mentioned alongside him in Marduk's Address to the Demons, was associated with sailors, and it has been proposed that he can be identified as the so-called "boat god" on cylinder seals. Laguda is also referenced in the incantation series Šurpu, where he is listed alongside the river god Lugalidda and the sea god Lugala'abba.

The currently unpublished god list Anšar = Anum refers to Laguda as a name of Marduk, and associates him with Dilmun. It is possible that he also appears in an enumeration of Marduk's names in another list. However, the text Marduk's Address to the Demons attests that they were separate deities:

Worship
Laguda's cult center was most likely the city Nēmed-Laguda, known from sources from the first millennium BCE. Its precise location is not known, but based on mentions in ancient texts it can be assumed that it was close to cities such as Eridu, Larsa, Uruk and Ur.  It was also associated with Ea according to a neo-Babylonian royal letter. At one point, gods of Nēmed-Laguda were returned by Sargon II.

Laguda is also attested in two theophoric names from Nippur from the earlier Kassite period, Tukulti-Laguda and Burra-Laguda. The element burra- in the latter name is Kassite,  making Laguda one of the deities who appear in Kassite theophoric names despite belonging to the Mesopotamian, rather than Kassite, pantheon. His name was in this case written with a divine determinative (dingir), a cuneiform sign designating divine names, unlike the names of any Kassite deities other than Shuqamuna and Shumaliya.

References

Bibliography

Mesopotamian gods
Sea and river gods